Aye Zan (born 4 April 1954) is a Burmese politician. He served as chief minister for Mon State from 1 March 2017 to 1 February 2021.

Early life and education 
Aye Zan is an ethnic Mon and he was born on 4 April 1954 in Mudon, Mon State. He graduated from University of Medicine 2, Yangon with medical degree in 1979.

Political career 
Aye Zan is a member of National League for Democracy's central executive committee. He is also chairman of Kyaikto Township' National League for Democracy party (NLD). He led Kyaikto Township's NLD party since 1988.

He won a seat in the 1990 election, but was never allowed to assume his seat. In 2015 Myanmar general election, he was elected as a Mon State Hluttaw MP for Kyaikto Township No.2 constituency.

Chief minister 
After former chief minister Min Min Oo resigned from his post, Aye Zan was appointed as a chief minister of Mon State by president Htin Kyaw on 1 March 2017.

In the wake of the 2021 Myanmar coup d'état on 1 February, Aye Zan was detained by the Myanmar Armed Forces.

References 

1954 births
Living people
Government ministers of Myanmar
People from Mon State
Burmese people of Mon descent
National League for Democracy politicians
University of Medicine 2, Yangon alumni
Burmese physicians